Kaanch Ke Rishte is a television drama series airing on DD National, based on the story of a retired journalist and his wife. The series premiered on 29 March 2009 and airs every Sunday at 9:30pm IST. It is directed by Arshad Khan, written by Nawaab Arzoo and the supervising producer and the creative director of this show is Tariq Mohammad (Tariq Mohd.).

Plot

The story is of a retired newspaper editor who lives with his wife in a huge mansion all by themselves without their sons and other extended family members. Since the house is located on the sea shores, many of the builders keep an eye on the property. Therefore, they lure the sons of the newspaper editor and promise them to give a huge amount of money if they can get the bungalow vacated. Henceforth, the sons get the house vacated with conspiracy and sell it to the builders. But later on they realise how much harm they have done to their parents.

Cast
Rajiv Verma
Rupa Devatia
 Surendra Pal
Anant Jog
Neeraj Bhardwaj
Feroj Khan
Raj Gopal
Digvijay Purohit
Shravani Goswami
Asha Vyas

References

DD National original programming
Indian television series
2009 Indian television series debuts